This page is about Goan achievers in the world of sports. Goa is a tiny region along the west coast of India, and is known for its many sportsmen.

Football/Soccer 
This page lists out the names of Goan soccer players who have represented India in international matches, along with the year of their first international cap.

The first Goan to have played for India, representing Goa, is Menino Figuereido who represented India on a goodwill tour of Russia in 1963. This tour is not considered an official tour and some say the first Goan to have represented India thus becomes Visitacao Lobo in 1970.

For Bombay, and international caps
Much before 19 December 1961, the day Portuguese colonial rule ended in Goa, Goans had made a mark in Indian football. Many represented India by playing for Bombay and shining at the domestic level and thus earning international caps.

In the list below, names of such Goans are included, with the name of the domestic team in parentheses.

 Neville D'Souza: 1953 (Bombay)
 Anthony Braganza: 1954 (Bombay)
 Fortunato Franco: 1960 (Bombay)
 Derek D'Souza: 1960 (Bombay)
 Menino Figueireido: 1963
 Marto Gracias: 1967 (Bombay)
 Andrew D'Souza: 1968
 Visitacao Lobo: 1970
 Ramesh Redkar: 1973
 Nicholas Pereira: 1973
 Bernard Pereira: 1973
 Brahmanand Sankhwalkar: 1976
 Arnold Rodrigues: 1977
 Prakash Naik: 1977
 Armando Colaco: 1977
 Francis D'Souza: 1978
 Anthony Rebello: 1982
 Jose D'Souza: 1983
 Camilo Gonsalves: 1983
 Bento Andrew: 1983
 Mahesh Lotlikar: 1983
 Chandrakant Naik: 1984
 Mauricio Afonso: 1984
 Arnold Rodrigues: 1984
 Anthony D'Souza: 1984
 Ashok Fadte: 1984
 Ignatius Dias: 1984
 Derrick Pereira: 1984
 Savio Medeira: 1987
 Lawrence Gomes: 1984
 Johnny Araujo: 1987
 Lector Mascarenhas: 1989
 Norbert Gonsalves: 1989
 Mario Soares: 1989
 Bruno Coutinho: 1991
 Roy Barretto: 1992
 Francis Silveira: 1993
 Roberto Fernandez: 1996
 Francis Coelho: 1996
 Franky Barretto: 1997
 Jules Alberto: 1999
 Mahesh Gawli: 1999
 Anthony Pereira: 2000
 Roque Barreto: 2000
 Alvito D'Cunha: 2001
 Alex Ambrose: 2002
 Samir Naik: 2002
 Selwyn Fernandes: 2003
 Climax Lawrence: 2003
 Felip Gomes: 2005
 Bibiano Fernandes: 2005
 Clifford Miranda: 2005
 Micky Fernandes: 2006
 Fredy Mascarenhas: 2006
 Denzil Franco: 2010
 Joaquim Abranches: 2011
 Francis Fernandes: 2011
 Peter Carvalho: 2011
 Rowilson Rodrigues: 2011
 Valeriano Rebello: 2011
 Lenny Rodrigues: 2012
 Adil Khan: 2012
 Dawson Fernandes: 2013
 Victorino Fernandes: 2013
 Rowllin Borges: 2015
 Augustin Fernandes: 2015
 Cavin Lobo: 2015
 Romeo Fernandes: 2015
 Fulganco Cardozo: 2016
 Brandon Fernandes: 2019
 Mandar Rao Dessai: 2019
 Liston Colaco: 2021
 Glan Martins: 2021
 Seriton Fernandes: 2021

Junior national teams
The following have represented Indian junior national teams in age-group tournaments but not represented the senior national team.

 Lawrence Gomes in 1982 for India u-19 Asian Youth Championships Captain
 Seby Antao in 1988 for India u-19
 Alex Alvares in 1991 for India U-21
 Victor Lobo in 1995 for India U-23
 Melwyn Rodrigues in 1998 for India u-21
 Covan Lawrence in 1998 for India U-19
 Milagrio Madeira in 2001 for India U-19
 Godwin Franco in 2003 for India U-19
 Garry D'Mello in 2004 for India U-19
 Marcelino Dias in 2004 for India U-18
 Bernard Pires in 2005 for India U-23
 Cliffton Gonsalves in 2005 for India U-20
 Terence Lobo in 2005 for India U-20
 Laxmikant Kattimani in 2005 for India U-20
 Steven Fernandes in 2005 for India U-20
 Joshuah Vaz in 2005 for India U-16
 Beevan D'Mello in 2006 for India U-20
 Branco Cardozo - (TFA Jamshedpur) in 2006 played for India U-19
 Shallum Pires in 2006 for India U-14
 Lavino Fernandes in 2006 for India U-20
 Myron Mendes in 2009 for India U-14
 Albino Gomes in 2009 for India U-16
 Meldon D'Silva in 2009 for India U-16
 Anthony Barbosa in 2011 for India U-23
 Prathamesh Maulingkar in 2012 for India U-22
 Suhas Gaonkar
 Sarto Baptista
 Anthony Baptista
 Suhas Walke

India schools
The following have played for India schools only and not for any other junior national team.

 Inacio Fernandes
 Michael Gomes
 Casmiro Palha
 Joaquim Palha
 Peter Santamaria-Woods

Captains for India 
Brahmanand Shankhwalkar, Bruno Coutinho, Mauricio Afonso, and Roberto Fernandez have captained the Indian senior national team. Seby Antao and Lawrence Gomes have captained the India national youth team.

References

External links
 Indian Football
 Sporty Goans
 Goa Football Association

Footballers from Goa
Lists of Indian sportspeople
Lists of people from Goa
Association football player non-biographical articles